Pambazo is a Mexican dish or antojito (very similar to the torta) made with pambazo bread dipped and fried in a red guajillo pepper sauce. It is traditionally filled with papas con chorizo (potatoes with chorizo) or with papas only but there are different varieties.

Ingredients and preparation 
The bread used for pambazos is white and lacks a crispy crust. This particular bread is made of flour, and is softer than the similar bolillo (also used for sandwiches), which allows it to retain its shape while being soaked in sauce. Teleras are usually found in Mexican bakeries where they are sold just as any other white bread.

It is unclear since when or why the pambazo is prepared and filled in a very specific way. While other similar dishes changed the fillings or toppings, the pambazo recipe remains almost the same. The bread is first filled with the potato and chorizo, then dipped in warm red guajillo pepper sauce, which gives the bread its famous orange-red sprinkled coloration. Once the bread has been soaked, it is passed on to fry in a bit of oil. The pambazo is to fry on the top and bottom of the bread. The pambazo is ready whenever the bread being fried becomes crispy on both sides. It is then garnished with shredded lettuce, salsa (sauce), crema (cream), and queso fresco (fresh cheese).

In the Mexican State of Veracruz, the pambazo, the bread, after some proofing the  buns are punched in a bed of wheat flour and then back to proofing and baked. Once the bread is ready the top remain dusted and is sliced to the filling of layered grided refried black beans with chorizo, shredded lettuce, sliced chipotle peppers in adobo, ground or squared queso blanco or queso fresco and spread mayonaisse. From food stands to backpacks or school lunch boxes the sandwich is wrapped in napkins to gently avoid dusted fingers, nose and lips. In other regions is filled with ham or polish meat. At birthday parties, parties or social events, small sized pambazos are served instead of canapés. These are known as pambacitos, which literally means "little pambazo".

History

The pambazo bread got its name from the Ladino word pan basso (Spanish pan bajo) or low-class bread from Mexico's viceregal period. During that period, there were bakeries in Mexico dedicated solely to this type of bread named 'panbasserias' (pambacerías).

"On this type of bread, inferior quality flour or flour from deteriorated wheat were mixed to produce the pan basso. Bakeries produced minimal quantities of pan basso, a maximum of 4% of all flour in Mexico City"

Virginia García Acosta, Las panaderías, sus dueños y trabajadores. Ciudad de México. Siglo XVII.

Varieties

State of Mexico

In some villages from State of Mexico, the pambazos are made with Semitic Mediterranean cuisine influence by the use the acemite or bran for bread made in artisan bakeries about horns of Spanish colonial period, as the case of Malinalco, Tequixquiac and Amecameca.

In Malinalco, state of Mexico makes other pambazos, a Spanish colonial meal are made flour more small to Mexico City pambazos, filled with sausage and potatoes, chicken meat with epazote, shredded lettuce, white cheese, cream and spicy salsa.

In the Mexican state of Tequixquiac pambazos are very different from those of Mexico City, being made flour with dark wheat rind or bran named acemite, filled with sausage and potatoes, turkey meat or lamb meat (barbacoa), shredded lettuce, white cheese, cream and spicy chili chipotle sauce, fried with butter. The name is registered in this place as pan bazo, an archaic Spanish word.

State of Puebla

In Puebla City, pambazos are made with flour in the bread named cemita or acemite, filled with sausage and potatoes, avocado, papalo, white cheese, cream and with red spicy salsa on the pambazo.

State of Veracruz
In Orizaba, Veracruz, an important place with Sephardic roots, is made a pambazo with Carne Polaca "Polish meat", is mixture with traditional pambazo or acemite, meat and lettuce, with spicy sauce.

Reception 
The Daily Meal reviewed the pambazo with "it’s insanely delicious" in their article "12 Life-Changing Sandwiches You've Never Heard Of".

See also
 Torta ahogada
 List of Mexican dishes

References

Further reading

External links

Recipe 

Mexican breads
Pork sandwiches
Sausage sandwiches